Stripped is a live album by the English rock band the Rolling Stones released in November 1995 after the Voodoo Lounge Tour. It contains six live tracks and eight studio recordings. The live tracks were taken from four 1995 performances, at three small venues, and include a cover of Bob Dylan's "Like a Rolling Stone", which was the first single from the album. The remaining eight tracks were acoustic studio re-recordings of songs from the Stones' previous catalogue, the exception being a cover of Willie Dixon's "Little Baby". The studio performances were recorded "live," i.e., without overdubs.

Overview
The two studio sessions took place from 3–5 March 1995 at Toshiba-EMI Studios in Tokyo, Japan and 23–26 July 1995 at Estudios Valentim De Carvalho in Lisbon, Portugal, while the live recordings are from 26 and 27 May, 3 July, and 19 July 1995 performances at three small concert venues: Paradiso, L'Olympia, and Brixton Academy, respectively.

Some CD versions of Stripped included an enhanced portion for viewing on a computer, including videos of rehearsals of "Tumbling Dice" and "Shattered" and an alternate performance of "Like a Rolling Stone", and interviews with Mick Jagger, Keith Richards, Charlie Watts and Ronnie Wood.

Stripped was well-received and reached No. 9 in the UK and the US, where it went platinum. The lead single, a cover of Dylan's "Like a Rolling Stone", reached No. 12 in the UK, becoming a rock radio hit in the US. It was followed by "Wild Horses" in early 1996.

Stripped was the Rolling Stones' second album with Virgin Records.

Totally Stripped
On 3 June 2016, Totally Stripped, an expanded and reconceived edition of Stripped featuring a documentary film about the original project, was released in multiple formats. These included DVD or Blu-ray documentary-only editions, as well as DVD/Blu-ray & CD and DVD/Blu-ray & LP editions adding a single disc or double-LP of concert highlights (distinct from the tracks that comprised the original album) to the film.  The selection of live highlights included 13 previously unreleased performances and one track from the original CD.  A limited edition five-disc version (4 DVDs & 1 CD or 4 Blu-ray discs & 1 CD) of the expanded album added three DVD or SD Blu-ray films of the complete concerts and a 60-page booklet to the documentary and the newly compiled CD of concert highlights.

Artwork
The artwork for the album was provided by The Design Corporation, with photography from Anton Corbijn.

Track listing
All tracks written by Mick Jagger and Keith Richards, except where noted.

Standard edition
"Street Fighting Man" – 3:41 
"Like a Rolling Stone" (Bob Dylan) – 5:39 
"Not Fade Away" (Norman Petty/Charles Hardin) – 3:06  
"Shine a Light" – 4:38 
"The Spider and the Fly" – 3:29 
"I'm Free" – 3:13 
"Wild Horses" – 5:09 
"Let It Bleed" – 4:15 
"Dead Flowers" – 4:13 
"Slipping Away" – 4:55 
"Angie" – 3:29 
"Love in Vain" (Robert Johnson) – 5:31 
"Sweet Virginia" – 4:16 
"Little Baby" (Willie Dixon) – 4:00

Outtakes
Officially released outtakes
Some outtakes from this album have also been (officially) released.
"Honest I Do" (Jimmy Reed) (Hope Floats Movie Soundtrack) 
"All Down The Line" ("Like a Rolling Stone" single) 
"Black Limousine" (Jagger/Richards/Ronnie Wood) ("Like a Rolling Stone" single) 
"Gimme Shelter" ("Wild Horses" single) 
"Tumbling Dice" ("Wild Horses" single) 
"Live With Me" ("Wild Horses" single) 
"It's All Over Now" (Womack/Womack) (e-download only) 

Other circulating outtakes
These include studio reworkings of:
"Let's Spend the Night Together", 
"No Expectations", 
"Beast of Burden", 
"Memory Motel", and 
"Let It Bleed".

2016 Totally Stripped five-disc limited edition

CD Track listing
"Not Fade Away" (Norman Petty/Charles Hardin) –  
"Honky Tonk Women"  –  
"Dead Flowers"  –  
"Far Away Eyes"  –  
"Shine a Light" –  
"I Go Wild"  –  
"Miss You"  –  
"Like a Rolling Stone" (Bob Dylan)  –  
"Brown Sugar"  – 
"Midnight Rambler"  –  
"Jumping Jack Flash"  – 
"Gimme Shelter"  –  
"Rip This Joint"  –  
"Street Fighting Man"  –

DVD/Blu-ray #1: Totally Stripped documentary (new version)
This new version includes 30 minutes of never-before-released rehearsals and interviews footages.

DVD/Blu-ray #2: Paradiso, Amsterdam, 26 May 1995

DVD/Blu-ray #3: Olympia, Paris, 3 July 1995

DVD/Blu-ray #4: Brixton Academy, London, 19 July 1995

Personnel
The Rolling Stones
Mick Jagger – lead vocals, harmonica, guitar, maracas on "Not Fade Away"
Keith Richards – guitar, backing vocals; lead vocals on "Slipping Away"
Ronnie Wood – guitar, lap slide
Charlie Watts – drums

Additional musicians
Darryl Jones – bass guitar, backing vocals on "Slipping Away"
Chuck Leavell – keyboards, backing vocals
Lisa Fischer – backing vocals
Bernard Fowler – backing vocals, percussion
Bobby Keys – saxophone
Michael Davis – trombone
Kent Smith – trumpet
Andy Snitzer – saxophone
Don Was – Hammond B-3 Organ on "Shine a Light"

Charts

Weekly charts

Year-end charts

Certifications and sales

References

1995 live albums
2016 live albums
2016 video albums
Albums produced by Don Was
Albums produced by the Glimmer Twins
Eagle Rock Entertainment live albums
Eagle Rock Entertainment video albums
Live video albums
The Rolling Stones documentary films
The Rolling Stones live albums
The Rolling Stones video albums
Virgin Records live albums